Vylok (formerly ) is an urban-type settlement in Berehove Raion (district) of Zakarpattia Oblast (region) in western Ukraine.

The village is located around 15 (by rail) / 16 (by highway) km  of Vynohradiv, and 22 km  of Berehove along the right bank of the river Tisza.

History 

Urban-type settlement since 1959. In 1968, its population was 3.5 thousand people, there were a lumber mill and a shoe factory.

Population was 3,422 as of the 2001 Ukrainian Census. 80% of its population was Hungarian and mayor was Yosyp Kilb (József Kilb).

References

Gallery

Urban-type settlements in Berehove Raion
Populated places established in the 13th century